The Middle Atlantic Conferences men's basketball tournaments are the annual conference basketball championship tournaments for the NCAA Division III Middle Atlantic Conferences: the MAC Commonwealth and MAC Freedom.

The MAC has held a tournament more or less every year since 1947, although the current two-conference format has only been played since 2001. They are each a single-elimination tournament and seeding is based on regular season records.

The winners, each declared champion of their respective conference, receives one of the MAC's two automatic bids to the NCAA men's Division III basketball championship.

College Division/Division III results

Middle Atlantic Conference (1947–49)

 No tournament held between 1950 and 1957

MAC College Division (1958–66)

 No tournament held in 1967

MAC Northern Division (1968–93)

MAC Southern Division (1968–93)

Middle Atlantic Conference (1994–2000)

MAC Commonwealth (2001–present)

MAC Freedom (2001–present)

Championship records

College Division/Division III

 York (PA) have yet to advance to the MAC tournament finals.
 Schools highlighted in pink are former members of the MAC.

References

NCAA Division III men's basketball conference tournaments
Middle Atlantic Conference men's basketball tournament
Basketball Tournaments, Men's
Recurring sporting events established in 1947